The Eastern Pact was a proposed mutual-aid treaty, intended to bring France, the Soviet Union, Czechoslovakia, Poland, Finland, Estonia, Latvia, and Lithuania together in opposition to Nazi Germany.

The idea of the Eastern Pact was advanced early in 1934 by the French minister of foreign affairs, Louis Barthou, and was actively supported by the Soviet government. In May and June 1934, the Soviet Union and France agreed to conclude a bilateral treaty providing for France's guaranteeing of the Eastern Pact and the guaranteeing of the Locarno Treaties of 1925 by the Soviet Union. On 14 June 1934 the government of the USSR invited all interested states to participate in the Eastern Pact. Czechoslovakia (2 July), Latvia and Estonia (29 July), and Lithuania (3 August) declared their readiness to adhere to the pact. However, Estonia and Latvia made the adherence of Germany and Poland a condition of their own participation. The government of Finland avoided expressing its attitude toward the Eastern Pact. Barthou appealed to the British government in the name of the government of France, but the British, while formally approving the idea of the Eastern Pact, made their support conditional on Germany's inclusion both in the regional mutual-aid treaty and in the Franco-Soviet treaty, so that Soviet and French guarantees would be extended to Germany. The governments of the Soviet Union and France agreed to this. However, Hitler Cabinet (11 September 1934) and subsequently the government of Poland (27 September 1934) refused to participate in the Eastern Pact.

After the assassination of Barthou by Vlado Chernozemski on 9 October 1934, the French diplomacy together with the British turned away from the Soviet Union and adopted the Appeasement policy towards Nazi Germany. The proposed Eastern Pact was never implemented.

See also
 Soviet–Finnish Non-Aggression Pact
 Soviet–Lithuanian Non-Aggression Pact
 Soviet–Polish Non-Aggression Pact
 Soviet–Estonian Non-Aggression Pact
 Franco-Soviet Treaty of Mutual Assistance

References
 The Great Soviet Encyclopedia, 3rd Edition (1970-1979);
 JSTOR: The Slavonic and East European Review, Vol. 55, No. 1 (Jan., 1977), pp. 45-64

1934 in international relations
Treaties of the Soviet Union
Foreign relations of the Soviet Union
Proposed treaties
France–Soviet Union relations